The military ranks of the Ottoman Empire may be visually identified by the military insignia used during the Military of the Ottoman Empire.

Army ranks

Classic Army 
 Aghas were commanders of the different branches of the military services, like "azap agha", "besli agha", "janissary agha", for the commanders of azaps, beslis, and janissaries, respectively. This designation was given to commanders of smaller military units, too, for instance the "bölük agha", and the "ocak agha", the commanders of a "bölük" (company) and an "ocak" (troops) respectively.
 Boluk-bashi was a commander of a "bölük", equivalent with the rank of captain.
 Chorbaji (Turkish for "soup server") was a commander of an orta (regiment), approximately corresponding to the rank of colonel today. In seafaring, the term was in use for the boss of a ship's crew, a role similar to that of boatswain.

Modern Army 
Military personnel in the Ottoman Empire were assigned different duties according to their capabilities in order to administer the Armed Forces and particularly to be successful in battle. They were given various ranks so that they could conduct relations with each other and be fully aware of their duties. The issue of what sort of duties should be allocated to which unit or to which military institution used to be determined by the ranking within the Armed Forces. In Islamic countries, certain 'degrees', instead of ranks, were given in accordance with the categorization of government duties. In the course of time, these 'degrees' had taken on certain characteristics. In the Ottoman Empire, besides the ranks that were awarded after passing through certain stages of promotion, there was also the rank of "Pasha" that was given directly by the Ottoman Sultan. This rank, which continued until the establishment of the Republic of Turkey, was also given to civilian administrators who were approved of and found suitable. After the establishment of the Republic, the Sultanate was abolished, and the title became synonymous with the General rank, restricted to the Armed Forces only. Paymaster of a regiment - Captain of the Right Wing (Alay Emini - Sağ Kolağası): The rank of the Captain of the Right Wing was very high. The rank of the Adjutant and Paymaster of a regiment was also high but such individuals were not from the military class and they dealt with clerical duties and equipment needed by the regiment. Captain of the Wing - The Captain of the Left Wing- (Kolağası - Sol Kolağası): Captain of the Wing or the Captain of the Left Wing was the senior Captain. If he was educated in the regiment, he was called "Ağa" but if he was the son of a pasha, he was called "Bey".

Officers
The rank insignia of commissioned officers.

Other ranks
The rank insignia of non-commissioned officers and enlisted personnel.

Navy

Officers 
The rank insignia of commissioned officers.

Other ranks 
The rank insignia of non-commissioned officers and enlisted personnel.

References

 
Ottoman Empire
Military of the Ottoman Empire